Lim Sang-hyub  (born 8 July 1988) is a South Korean football player who currently plays as a winger or forward for FC Seoul.

Club career 
Lim joined Busan IPark from Jeonbuk Motors before the 2011 season, and he quickly became a regular for the side. He started the 2013 K-League season in impressive form, netting five times in the opening ten league fixtures. On 4 August 2013, Lim scored a hat-trick in a 5–1 victory over Gyeongnam. He finished the season as IPark's top league scorer with nine goals. In the 2014 K League 1 season, Lim was once again the club's top scorer with eleven goals. He was also included in the league's 'Best Eleven' for the 2014 season.

Lim joined army side Sangju Sangmu for the 2015 season to complete his mandatory military service. He returned to Busan for the final stages of the 2016 season, and remained with the club in 2017 despite their failure to gain promotion to the K League 1. Lim signed for Suwon Bluewings at the start of the 2018 season, but joined Jeju United on loan in 2019 after struggling for game time.

For the 2023 season, on 22nd December 2022, he joined FC Seoul.

International career 
On 14 August 2013 Lim made his debut for the Korean national team in a 0–0 friendly draw against Peru. He appeared as a substitute, replacing Yun Il-Lok in the 57th minute.

Club career statistics

International goals

Suwon Samsung Bluewings

Honours 
Individual
K League 1 Best XI (2): 2014, 2021
AFC Champions League(1):Second place

External links 

1988 births
Living people
Association football midfielders
South Korean footballers
Jeonbuk Hyundai Motors players
Busan IPark players
Gimcheon Sangmu FC players
Jeju United FC players
Pohang Steelers players
FC Seoul players
K League 1 players
K League 2 players
Footballers from Seoul